Michael Somers (born 2 March 1995) is a Belgian long-distance runner. He won the 5000 meters at the 2019 Belgian Athletics Championships. He also won the overall title of the 2021–22 Lotto Cross Cup.

References

1995 births
Living people
Belgian male long-distance runners